Fatafehi Laufilitonga (24 August 1797 – 9 December 1865) was the 39th and last Tui Tonga, a dynasty of kings in Tonga during the Tui Tonga Empire.

Biography
Only little is known about Laufilitonga's life.

Laufilitonga was the oldest son of king Fatafehi Fuanunu'iava and his wife Tupou Veiongo Moheofo.

He succeeded his father in 1810 as head of the House of Tonga but was considered too young to become "Tui Tonga". The title had by that time also declined in power and prestige and the real power lay with the Tui Kanokupolu dynasty.

Laufilitonga, however, had ambitions to restore the power of the Tui Tonga and tried to extend his role as spiritual leader into a more political one. He contested Tāufaāhau (later to be George Tupou I) residing in the Haapai Islands.

The final resolution of this struggle was the "Battle of Velata", near Tongoleleka on Lifuka, in 1826 in which Laufilitonga was defeated. An important ally at that battle was the chief of Haafeva who had taken side against Laufilitonga.

Although Laufilitonga was installed as Tui Tonga in 1827, the holder of the title no longer had either political or spiritual power.

On November 7, 1851 Laufilitonga converted to Catholicism and was baptised with the name Samuelio Fatafehi Laufilitonga.

After his death in 1865 he was buried in the langi Tuofefafa i in Mua and the title Tui Tonga was abolished.

His wife Sālote Lupepauʻu later married the 1st King of Tonga, George Tupou I.

Notes

Bibliography
I.C. Campbell; Classical Tongan kingship; 1989
E. Bott; Tonga society at the time of Captain Cook's visit; 1982
O. Māhina; Images from the history and culture of Tonga; 2006

1797 births
1865 deaths
Tongan monarchs
Tongan Roman Catholics
Converts to Roman Catholicism
History of Tonga